Jacques Baumel (6 March 1918 – 17 February 2006) was a French politician. He was born on 6 March 1918 in Marseille and died on 17 February 2006 in Rueil-Malmaison. He was a French Resistance fighter (under the aliases "Saint-Just", "Berneix" or "Rossini"), deputy in the National Assembly, a senator, an important leader of the Gaullist movement, and secretary of state and mayor of Rueil-Malmaison.

Resistance fighter
After medical studies in France, Baumel took part in the French Resistance and directed the Combat resistance group in[Marseille. In 1943, he was secretary general of the Mouvements Unis de la Résistance (United movements of the Resistance) (MUR). In 1945, helped to found the Union démocratique et socialiste de la Résistance (UDSR). He was amember of the Provisional Consultative Assembly. In 1945, he was elected deputy of the National Assembly of Moselle to the First National Constituent Assembly, was elected in Creuse to the Second Assembly but defeated in the elections to the National Assembly of 1946. He chaired the parliamentary group of the UDSR. He participated in the development of Rassemblement du peuple français (Rally of the French People) (RPF) from its founding in 1947.

Record of political longevity 
As a senator from 1959 to 1967, he was one of the assistant secretaries general of the Union for the New Republic (UNR). He went to the United States and examined the campaign of John F. Kennedy in 1960. He became the general secretary of the Gaullist movement on 7 December 1962 after the success of the UNR in November, a position he held until 19 January 1968, when he was replaced by Robert Poujade. He was elected during the new elections to the National Assembly in 1967 and held a seat in Palais Bourbon until 2002. He was a member of the UniNR, of the Union for the Defence of the Republic (UDR) and Rally for the Republic (RPR).

Mayor for 33 years
Baumel was secretary of sate to the prime minister, Jacques Chaban-Delmas, from 20 June 1969 to 5 July 1972. He practiced an active policy of twinning with many foreign cities (19 in all). His municipal policy promoted the establishment of head offices of important business, both French and foreign. The preschool system is particularly strong in his city. A library opened in 2002 that bears his name.

Expert on parliamentary diplomacy 
He chaired the general council of Hauts-de-Seine for nine years starting in 1970 (from 1970 to 1973 and from 1976 to 1982). Internationally, he represented the French Parliament in the Assembly of the Western European Union and the Inter-Parliamentary Union where he opposed all forms of totalitarianism.

He is buried in the village cemetery of Fourneville in Calvados. His wife, Louise Bachelot, was born on 11 September 1924 and died on 14 November 2013.

Baumel appeared as a witness in Patrick Pesnot's 2005 television documentary, La traversée du désert (Crossing the Desert).

Publications

Achievements 
 Officer of the Legion of Honour
 Compagnon de la Libération (Companion of the Liberation)
 Croix de guerre 1939–1945 (1939-1945 War Cross)
 French Resistance Medal

References

External links 
 Baumel biography on the National Assembly website 
 Baumel on the Senate website 

1918 births
2006 deaths
Politicians from Marseille
Democratic and Socialist Union of the Resistance politicians
Rally of the French People politicians
Union for the New Republic politicians
Union of Democrats for the Republic politicians
Rally for the Republic politicians
Members of the Constituent Assembly of France (1945)
Members of the Constituent Assembly of France (1946)
French Senators of the Fifth Republic
Senators of Seine (department)
Presidents of the General Council of Hauts-de-Seine
Deputies of the 3rd National Assembly of the French Fifth Republic
Deputies of the 4th National Assembly of the French Fifth Republic
Deputies of the 5th National Assembly of the French Fifth Republic
Deputies of the 6th National Assembly of the French Fifth Republic
Deputies of the 7th National Assembly of the French Fifth Republic
Deputies of the 8th National Assembly of the French Fifth Republic
Deputies of the 9th National Assembly of the French Fifth Republic
Deputies of the 10th National Assembly of the French Fifth Republic
Deputies of the 11th National Assembly of the French Fifth Republic
Mayors of places in Île-de-France
French military personnel of World War II
French Resistance members
Companions of the Liberation
Officiers of the Légion d'honneur
Recipients of the Croix de Guerre 1939–1945 (France)
Recipients of the Resistance Medal